Paden–Kahan subproblems are a set of solved geometric problems which occur frequently in inverse kinematics of common robotic manipulators. Although the set of problems is not exhaustive, it may be used to simplify inverse kinematic analysis for many industrial robots.

Simplification strategies 

For a structure equation defined by the product of exponentials method, Paden–Kahan subproblems may be used to simplify and solve the inverse kinematics problem. Notably, the matrix exponentials are non-commutative.

Generally, subproblems are applied to solve for particular points in the inverse kinematics problem (e.g., the intersection of joint axes) in order to solve for joint angles.

Eliminating revolute joints 

Simplification is accomplished by the principle that a rotation has no effect on a point lying on its axis. For example, if the point  is on the axis of a revolute twist , its position is unaffected by the actuation of the twist. To wit:

Norm 

In some cases, the problem may also be simplified by subtracting a point from both sides of the equation and taking the norm of the result.

Subtracting  and taking the norm of both sides yields 
This may be solved using Subproblem 3.

List of subproblems 
Each subproblem is presented as an algorithm based on a geometric proof. Code to solve a given subproblem, which should be written to account for cases with multiple solutions or no solution, may be integrated into inverse kinematics algorithms for a wide range of robots.

Subproblem 1: Rotation about a single axis 
Let  be a zero-pitch twist with unit magnitude and  be two points. Find  such that 
In this subproblem, a point  is rotated around a given axis  such that it coincides with a second point .

Solution 

For a vector  in the direction of the axis of ,andIn the event that ,  and both points lie on the axis of rotation. The subproblem therefore yields an infinite number of possible solutions in that case.

It is necessary to check, to wit, that:and that

Subproblem 2: Rotation about two subsequent axes 

Let  and  be two zero-pitch twists with unit magnitude and intersecting axes. Let  be two points. Find  and  such that 

Solution 

Therefore,

The values of the coefficients may be solved thus:, andThe subproblem yields two solutions in the event that the circles intersect at two points; one solution if the circles are tangential; and no solution if the circles fail to intersect.

Subproblem 3: Rotation to a given distance 

Let  be a zero-pitch twist with unit magnitude; let  be two points; and let  be a real number greater than 0. Find  such that 

In this problem, a point  is rotated about an axis  until the point is a distance  from a point .

Solution 

Subproblem 4: Rotation about two axes to a given distance 

Let  and  be two zero-pitch twists with unit magnitude and intersecting axes. Let  be points. Find  and  such that  and This problem is analogous to Subproblem 2, except that the final point is constrained by distances to two known points.

 Subproblem 5: Translation to a given distance Let  be an infinite-pitch unit magnitude twist;  two points; and  a real number greater than 0. Find  such that '''

References

Computational geometry
Robotic manipulation